Fatoş Sevinç Erbulak (born October 20, 1975, in Istanbul) is a Turkish actress, who acted in Kiralık Konak, Aşk-ı Memnû and Derya Gülü. She is the daughter of two famous actors Altan Erbulak and Füsun Erbulak. Sevinç is currently married to Dalin Midyat, with whom she has a daughter.

Filmography

External links

1975 births
Living people